José de Armas and Luis Horna were the defending champions, but Horna was unable to compete in Juniors as he turned 18 years old.

De Armas teamed up with Fernando González and successfully defended his title, by defeating Juan Carlos Ferrero and Feliciano López 6–7, 7–5, 6–3 in the final.

Draw

Finals

Top half

Bottom half

References

External links
 Official results archive (ITF)

Boys' Doubles
1998